CAD navigation refers to software tools which are used for the correlation of electronic semiconductor design data with a physical semiconductor device. CAD navigation tools consist of software that is capable of reading and displaying the physical layout and logical schematic for the device. The logical design consists of a netlist and/or a schematic. The physical design consists of a set of polygons which precisely represent the location of all electrical conductors, diffusions and interconnections in the physical semiconductor device. CAD navigation tools are often used to provide a cross-correlation between the logical design and the physical design. CAD navigation tools are used extensively with E-beam probers, focused-ion beam systems and photon probers for the purpose of semiconductor failure analysis.

Notes

References

Semiconductor analysis